Jugovac may refer to:

 Jugovac, Serbia, a village near Prokuplje
 Jugovac, Croatia, a village near Žakanje